Panchakki, known as the water mill. This monument is located in Aurangabad, Maharashtra, displays the scientific thought process put in medieval Indian architecture. It was designed to generate energy via water brought down from a spring on a mountain. The building, attached to the dargah of Baba Shah Musafir a Sufi saint is located in a garden near the Mahmud Darvaza and consist of a mosque, a madrassa, a kacheri, a minister's house, a sarai and houses for zananas.

History

Most of the buildings in the dargah complex (including Panchakki) were erected by Turktaz Khan, a noble on the staff of Nizam-ul-Mulk Asaf Jah in about 1695 A. D. The oblong reservoir in front of the mosque and fountains were added 20 years later by Jamil Beg Khan. Dating back to the 17th century, this ingenious water mill was designed to use the energy generated by flowing water from a nearby spring to turn the large grinding stones of the flour mill. Shah Mosafar died in Hijri 1110. This watermill was used to grind grain for the pilgrims and disciples of saints as well as for the troops of the garrison.

Operating process

The water-mill is kept fed with sufficient water by an underground conduit, which commences from a well just above the junction of the Harsul river with a tributary stream eight kilometers away. After crossing the tributary stream near its confluence with Harsul, this water-pipe proceeds to the Panchakki reservoir. The arrangement is such that the water is made to fall into the Panchakki cistern from quite a height in order to generate the necessary power to drive the mill. The cistern lies in front of the mosque whose bottom forms the roof of a spacious hall. The cool chambers of the hall are used in summers by pilgrims, and is about 164' X 31' ornamented with fountains. The excess of water is let in the Kham river.

A fine view of the Kham river can be had from the windows of this hall. There is also a cenotaph to the spiritual preceptor of Baba Musafir Shah and a tomb to his disciple Baba Shah Mahmood and a few other graves. A huge Banyan tree on the southern margin of the reservoir provides shade and adds beauty to the whole scene. In the North-West corner, adjacent to the cistern, is the water mill driven entirely by water power. It is said that in the olden days, grain could be ground without physical effort.

The country here exhibits one of the most picturesque landscapes about Aurangabad. The Kaula Nala skirts the garden, and is first crossed by an old bridge with pointed arches and then by a second bridge which spans it lower down. The walls of Begampura are to the right and the city walls are to the left, while Shah Musafir's garden is between the latter and the river bank. The garden walls descend down to the bed of the Nala; and the dargah and the accompanying buildings, with the cisterns and the fountains that are interspersed, blend picturesquely with the garden vegetation.

Recent
An 18th-century library, housing manuscripts and a number of precious books have been reopened after 70 years here (Aurangabad). The library treasured about 100,000 books and writing pieces until Indian independence (1947). However, it was closed down in the 1970s due to administrative reasons due to which many of the library books were shifted to Hyderabad. The library presently houses 2,500 books on various subjects related to history, law, medicine, Sufism, religion and philosophy in Arabic, penned by philosophers, saints and scholars in Urdu and Persian language.

Panchakki also houses the headquarters of the Waqf board of Maharashtra.

See also
Sufi Saints of Aurangabad
Aurangabad
Aurangabad Water System
Ajanta Caves

References

External links

 Wikimapia

Monuments and memorials in Maharashtra
Tourist attractions in Aurangabad, Maharashtra
Mughal architecture
Buildings and structures in Aurangabad, Maharashtra